Mount Gower (also known as Big Hill), is the highest mountain on Australia's subtropical Lord Howe Island in the Tasman Sea.

Ascending Gower entails a popular, guided, strenuous 8-hour return hike, though no special climbing skills are needed. The mountain is covered with rainforest, including cloud forest at the summit, containing many of the island's endemic plants.

See also

List of mountains in Australia

References

Geography of Lord Howe Island
Mountains of New South Wales